The Rough Guide to the Music of Morocco is a world music compilation album originally released in 2004. Part of the World Music Network Rough Guides series, the release covers the music of Morocco, which had been receiving new-found attention on  the world music circuit in the early 2000s. The compilation was curated by Andy Morgan, former manager of Tinariwen and organizer of the Festival in the Desert. Phil Stanton, co-founder of the World Music Network, was the producer. This album was followed by a second edition, which covered the same topic by showcasing  different artists.

Critical reception

The compilation's release was met with positive reviews. Robert Christgau described "minimal" tunes and spare textures, noting inconsistency from track to track. This diversity was praised by AllMusic's Adam Greenberg, who called the curative decision to include all major genres "admirable".

Track listing

References 

2004 compilation albums
World Music Network Rough Guide albums
World music albums by Moroccan artists